The WTA Indian Open is a tournament for professional female tennis players, held regularly since 2003 in various Indian cities. It was a WTA Tour event played on outdoor hardcourts. In 2008, it was classified as a Tier II event with the prize money of $600,000 – this made it the biggest women's tennis tournament in South and Southeast Asia that year. Following the restructuring of the WTA in 2009, there were no WTA tournaments in India until 2022 except some WTA Challengers. 

For the first time since 2008, a WTA 250 tournament will be held in India in 2022.

History
The event started in 2003 as a Tier IV event. It was held in SAAP Tennis Complex in Hyderabad, Telangana until 2005. In 2006, the event was upgraded to a Tier III event, and was moved to Bangalore. In 2008, it was upgraded further to a Tier II event.

The 2008 edition was won by 26-year-old, then eight-time Grand-Slam champion Serena Williams, who defeated Patty Schnyder in the finals, winning her 29th WTA Tour title.

Sponsors
From 2003–2005, the event was sponsored by Andhra Pradesh Tourism (AP Tourism), and the tournament was named accordingly. In 2006 and 2007, the event was sponsored by Sony Ericsson, and the tournament was also named after the sponsor. In 2008, it was sponsored by the Canara Bank which would have continued to sponsor the event if it had been held 2009 onwards.

Past finals

Singles

Doubles

See also
 Royal Indian Open
 Mumbai Open
 Maharashtra Open
 List of tennis tournaments

References

External links
 Official website

Bangalore Open
Tennis tournaments in India
Sport in Bangalore
Hard court tennis tournaments
WTA Tour
Recurring sporting events established in 2003
Recurring sporting events established in 2022
Recurring events disestablished in 2008
Defunct tennis tournaments in India
Sport in Hyderabad, India
Defunct sports competitions in India
WTA 125 tournaments
Sport in Chennai
Sport in Mumbai